Fountain County Courthouse is a historic courthouse located at Covington, Fountain County, Indiana. It was built in 1937 as a Public Works Administration project.

History

Fountain County Courthouse was designed by Louis Johnson, and completed in July 1937. The construction of the building cost $228,822.  It is a three-story, Art Deco style, flat roofed building faced with Indiana limestone.  It measures 116 feet by 89 feet and incorporates a 32 foot-square wired-glass skylight. It was built to replace three previous courthouses that were built in 1827, 1833, and 1859.

It was listed on the National Register of Historic Places in 2007.

Interior

The interior features a collection of murals, totaling 2,500 square foot, painted by Eugene Savage. The murals reflect the history of Fountain County. In 1983, the murals underwent conservation, using sealant which caused the paint to begin to peel from the walls.

References

Public Works Administration in Indiana
County courthouses in Indiana
Courthouses on the National Register of Historic Places in Indiana
Art Deco architecture in Indiana
Government buildings completed in 1937
Buildings and structures in Fountain County, Indiana
National Register of Historic Places in Fountain County, Indiana
1937 establishments in Indiana